Totem is the twelfth studio album by American heavy metal band Soulfly. It was released on August 5, 2022, by Nuclear Blast. It is also the first album to not feature long running lead guitarist Marc Rizzo who departed ways with the band in 2021. The album's producer Arthur Rizk, John Powers and Chris Ulsh contributed guitar solos.

Critical reception

Dan Slessor of Kerrang! states that "Superstition" is "an absolute beast to kick things off, and there's a pleasingly chaotic air to much of what they pack into 40 minutes".

Dom Lawson of Blabbermouth.net stated that the album "maintains the crushing heaviness of its immediate predecessors while managing to squeeze a bit of invention and perversity into the mix, too".

Matt Mills of Metal Hammer wrote that "Max Cavalera gets with the times and ramps up the aggro on Soulfly's new album Totem".

Max Heilman of Metal Injection wrote that "In true Soulfly fashion, the album culminates with a tapestry of shimmering synths, dense percussion arrangements, melodious brass and even vocoded singing—a bit of trippy weirdness to remind folks of where Soulfly's heart lies."

Track listing
All tracks are written by Max Cavalera and Zyon Cavalera.

Personnel

Soulfly
 Max Cavalera – vocals, rhythm guitar
 Zyon Cavalera – drums, Brazilian percussion
 Mike Leon – bass

Additional musicians
 Arthur Rizk – lead guitar
 John Powers – guitar solo on "Ancestors", "Ecstasy of Gold"
 Chris Ulsh – guitar solo on "Spirit Animal"
 John Tardy – vocals on "Scouring the Vile"
 Hornsman Coyote – vocals on "Spirit Animal", horns on "Spirit Animal"
 Leya Cavalera – baby growl on "Spirit Animal"
 Richie Cavalera – vocals on "Spirit Animal"

Production
 Arthur Rizk – production, mixing, mastering, engineering
 Max Cavalera - production
 John Aquilino – engineering
 John Powers – additional engineering

Artwork
 James Bousema – cover illustration, artwork

Charts

References

Soulfly albums
2022 albums